Arossia is a genus of barnacles belonging to the family Balanidae.

The species of this genus are found in Northern and Central America.

Species:

Arossia ashleyensis 
Arossia aurae 
Arossia bohaska 
Arossia cummembrana 
Arossia eyerdami 
Arossia glyptopoma 
Arossia henryae 
Arossia newmani 
Arossia panamensis 
Arossia rubra 
Arossia sendaica

References

Barnacles